Bryce Duke (born February 28, 2001) is an American professional soccer player who plays as a midfielder for Major League Soccer club Inter Miami.

Career
Duke was born in Casa Grande, Arizona, where he initially played youth soccer for CCV Stars. Following a trial in 2015, Duke was a part of the Real Salt Lake academy from 2016 to 2018 before joining the Barca Residency Academy. After spending one season with Barcelona Residency, Duke signed a professional contract with Los Angeles FC of Major League Soccer on January 25, 2020.

Duke made his professional debut for the club on February 18, 2020, in their CONCACAF Champions League match against Club Leon. Duke's Major League Soccer debut came in the first game of the season on March 1, 2020, as a stoppage time substitution against Inter Miami CF.

On January 4, 2022, Duke was traded to Inter Miami in exchange for $100,000 of General Allocation Money.

Career statistics

Club

References

External links 
 Los Angeles FC Profile.

2001 births
Living people
People from Casa Grande, Arizona
Sportspeople from the Phoenix metropolitan area
Soccer players from Arizona
American soccer players
Association football midfielders
Los Angeles FC players
Homegrown Players (MLS)
Major League Soccer players
Las Vegas Lights FC players
USL Championship players
Inter Miami CF players
Inter Miami CF II players
MLS Next Pro players